{{speciesbox
|name = Tumbledown red gum
|image = Eucalyptus dealbata habit.jpg
|image_caption = Eucalyptus dealbata growing near Armidale
|status =
|status_system =
|genus = Eucalyptus
|species = dealbata
|authority = A.Cunn. ex Schauer
|synonyms_ref =
|synonyms = 
 Eucalyptus dealbata A.Cunn. ex Schauer var. dealbata 
 Eucalyptus tereticornis var. dealbata (A.Cunn. ex Schauer) H.Deane & Maiden 
 Eucalyptus umbellata var. dealbata (A.Cunn. ex Schauer) Domin 
 Eucalyptus viminalis var. dealbata (A.Cunn. ex Schauer) C.Moore & Betche 
}}Eucalyptus dealbata, known as the tumbledown red gum or hill redgum, is a species of small tree that is endemic to eastern Australia. It has mostly smooth, white to grey or brownish bark, lance-shaped to egg-shaped adult leaves, flower buds in groups of between seven and eleven, white flowers and hemispherical fruit with the valves extended well beyond the rim of the fruit.thumb|225px|fruit

It has smooth white to grey or brownish bark, sometimes with persistent slabs of rough grey bark. Flowering occurs between September and November and the flowers are white.

Taxonomy and namingEucalyptus dealbata was first formally described in a manuscript by Allan Cunningham but the description was published in 1843 by Johannes Schauer in Walper's book Repertorium Botanices Systematicae. The specific epithet (dealbata) is a Latin word meaning "whitened" referring to the glaucous flower buds and fruit.

Distribution and habitat
The tumbledown red gum grows in grassy open woodland in poor, rocky soil south from Emerald in Queensland through the western slopes and tablelands of New South Wales. Some authorities list it as occurring in Victoria but the Royal Botanic Gardens Victoria lists examples occurring in that state as referring to Eucalyptus blakelyi''.

Uses
This eucalypt is a major source of pollen and the honey produced from it is pleasantly flavoured.

References

dealbata
Myrtales of Australia
Flora of New South Wales
Flora of Queensland
Plants described in 1843
Taxa named by Johannes Conrad Schauer